Micrurus collaris, the Guyana blackback coral snake, is a species of coral snake in the family Elapidae. Specimens have been identified mostly in Bolívar (state), Roraima, Amapá, and the Oko Mountains.

References 

collaris
Snakes of South America
Reptiles of Guyana
Reptiles of French Guiana
Reptiles of Brazil
Reptiles of Venezuela
Reptiles described in 1837